"Show Me Love (America)" is a song by English-Irish boy band The Wanted. It was released on 25 October 2013 as the fifth single from their third studio album, Word of Mouth (2013). The ballad, their first since 2011's "Warzone", was co-written by band member Nathan Sykes and produced by Fraser T Smith. It is the official song of the action film, 47 Ronin.

Background and promotion
On 9 September 2013, The Wanted uploaded a "Special Announcement" to their official YouTube page. They announced that, due to extra recording, Word of Mouth would not be released until 4 November, but, to make up for it, they announced the release of a brand new single called "Show Me Love (America)" and said it would be on the radio from 8am the following morning. They also revealed this on Twitter. It was later announced that the song would receive its world premiere on Capital FM the following morning.

On 27 October 2013, The Wanted performed "Show Me Love (America)" on the third live results show of The X Factor.

Tracklist
Digital Single
"Show Me Love (America)" [Supasound Remix] - 3:44
"We Own the Night" (Jon Dixon and Scott Mills Club Remix] - 6:28
"We Own the Night" (Bass Ninjas Remix) - 5:13

Chart performance
On 31 October 2013, the song debuted at number 18 on the Irish Singles Chart, becoming the band's lowest-charting single in Ireland since "Warzone". On 3 November, it came in at number eight on the UK Singles Chart, giving the band their tenth UK top 10 hit.

Charts

Release history

References

2013 singles
The Wanted songs
Island Records singles
Mercury Records singles
Songs written by Nathan Sykes
Songs written by Tim Woodcock
2013 songs
Pop ballads
Songs written by Cutfather
Song recordings produced by Fraser T. Smith
Songs about the United States